Mark Johnston (born March 4, 1938) is a former professional football cornerback who played five professional seasons 1960-1964 in the American Football League with the Houston Oilers, New York Jets, and the Oakland Raiders.  He was an American Football League All-Star in 1961, and was with the Oilers in the first three AFL Championship games, winning the title in 1960 and 1961.

A native of Sycamore, Illinois, he was a Northwestern University player from 1957-59. In his final season there, the Wildcats, coached by Ara Parseghian, had a record of 6-0 and were nationally ranked, defeating Oklahoma, Iowa, Minnesota, Michigan, Notre Dame and Indiana, before dropping their last three games to go 6-3.

Unclaimed in the 1960 NFL Draft, Johnston went on to have 14 interceptions in his pro career. 

He and the Oilers won the first AFL championship game on New Year's Day, 1961 over the San Diego Chargers, 24-16 before a crowd of 32,183 in Houston, Texas, led by quarterback George Blanda and flanker Billy Cannon, who hooked up on an 88-yard touchdown pass. Later that same year, on Christmas Eve, the same two teams met for the 1961 AFL championship before a crowd of 29,556 in San Diego, where the Oilers prevailed 10-3. That game's only touchdown came in the third quarter on a 35-yard pass from Blanda to Cannon.

Going for three championships in a row, the Oilers ended up losing to the Dallas Texans (who next year became the Kansas City Chiefs) in the longest title game in American pro football history. It took two overtime periods in Houston before the Texans came away with a 20-17 victory on a 25-yard field goal by Tommy Brooker. 

Johnston then concluded his pro career with the New York Jets and Oakland Raiders in 1964.

See also
List of American Football League players

1938 births
Living people
American football cornerbacks
Northwestern Wildcats football players
Houston Oilers players
New York Jets players
Oakland Raiders players
American Football League All-Star players
American Football League players